Marcus Forss (born 18 June 1999) is a Finnish professional footballer who plays as a forward for  club Middlesbrough and the Finland national team.

Forss is a graduate of the West Bromwich Albion academy and after transferring to Brentford B in 2017, he was promoted into the first team squad in 2018. Following four seasons with Brentford, Forss transferred to Middlesbrough in 2022. Forss made his international debut for Finland in November 2020, at the age of 20.

Club career

Early years
A forward, Forss began his career in his native Finland with spells at FC Ruskon Pallo, TuWe and the FDS-Suomi football school. At age 13, he moved to England to join the academy at Premier League club West Bromwich Albion and progressed to sign a two-year scholarship deal in 2015. He was called into the U21 squad for two EFL Trophy matches in the first half of the 2016–17 season and made one appearance, with a start in a 2–0 group stage defeat to Gillingham on 8 November 2016. Forss was released when his scholarship ended in May 2017.

Brentford

2017–2019 
On 22 June 2017, Forss joined the B team at Championship club Brentford on a two-year contract. After scoring 11 goals in his first 23 B team appearances, he signed a new -year contract in February 2018. He finished the 2017–18 season as the B team's top scorer with 21 goals and won the team's Player of the Year award. Forss was promoted into the first team squad for the 2018–19 season and despite missing five months of the campaign with a back injury, he was a regular inclusion in matchday squads when fit and finished the season with 9 appearances and two goals.

2019–20 
After one goal in three early-2019–20 season appearances, Forss signed a new four-year contract and joined League One club AFC Wimbledon on loan until the end of the 2019–20 season. He scored seven goals in his first seven appearances for the club and scored the first senior hat-trick of his career in a 4–1 victory over Southend United on 12 October. Four goals in five appearances in October 2019 won Forss the EFL Young Player of the Month award. Four further goals in December 2019 saw him nominated for the League One Player of the Month award. By the time his spell was ended early by a season-ending torn hamstring on 14 January 2020, he had scored 11 goals in 19 appearances. Forss' performances during the season were recognised with the AFC Wimbledon Young Player of the Year award.

2020–21 
Following surgery on his torn hamstring, Forss returned fit for the 2020–21 season and the departures of Ollie Watkins and Saïd Benrahma elevated him to second-choice behind incoming forward Ivan Toney. For two-thirds of the season he served predominantly as a substitute, playing forward and wing roles. Off the back of a spell of seven goals in 13 appearances, Forss signed a new -year contract in December 2020. In April 2021, a change in formation allowed Forss to break into the starting lineup, as one of two forwards alongside Ivan Toney. His first appearance as part of the new formation saw him score his first goal for over five months, in a 5–0 win over Preston North End. Brentford qualified for the promotion playoffs and playing as a substitute in the semi-final second leg versus Bournemouth, Forss scored the 81st-minute goal which secured a 3–2 aggregate victory and sent the Bees to a second consecutive playoff Final. Forss' 2020–21 season ended with 50 appearances, 10 goals and promotion to the Premier League after a 2–0 victory over Swansea City in the playoff Final.

2021–2022 
Forss began the 2021–22 season principally involved in Brentford's EFL Cup campaign, with his starting performances in second and third round matches versus Forest Green Rovers and Oldham Athletic yielding five goals. His four-goal haul in the latter match was recognised with a place in the EFL Cup Team of the Round and a nomination for Player of the Round. Forss' 2021–22 EFL Cup performances were later recognised with a place in the Team of the Tournament and his five goals scored in the tournament tied him with Eddie Nketiah as top-scorer. By the final day of the winter transfer window, Forss had scored six goals in 12 appearances, but with no goals in seven Premier League appearances. In need of "more consistent game time", Forss joined Championship club Hull City on loan until the end of the 2021–22 season. Deployed in a mix of starting and substitute roles, Forss made 11 appearances during his spell and scored one goal, in a 1–1 draw with Queens Park Rangers on 19 February 2022.

Ahead of the 2022–23 season, Forss was not called into Brentford's pre-season training camp in Germany and transferred out of the club in July 2022. He scored 19 goals in 74 appearances during four seasons as a first team player with the club. His 9 EFL Cup goals tied the club record.

Middlesbrough 

On 28 July 2022, Forss transferred to Championship club Middlesbrough and signed a four-year contract for an undisclosed fee. He scored his first goal for the club on his second appearance, in a 3–2 defeat to Queens Park Rangers on 6 August 2022. Following the sacking of manager Chris Wilder and the appointment of Michael Carrick on 24 October 2022, Forss ended a three-month goal drought. After being deployed on the right wing in late December 2022, he scored five goals in 9 appearances.

International career

Forss was capped by Finland at U17, U18, U19 and U21 level. He captained the U19 team, but was not included in the squad for the 2018 European U19 Championship on home soil due to club commitments. Good goalscoring form at club level saw Forss receive his maiden call up to the senior team for a series of three matches in November 2020. He made his debut with a start in a friendly versus France and scored the opening goal in the 2–0 victory. Forss was named in Finland's Euro 2020 squad and made two substitute appearances prior to the team's group stage exit. He made two appearances during Finland's failed 2022 World Cup qualification campaign, scoring one goal, which came in a 3–1 victory over Bosnia and Herzegovina in the penultimate group stage match.

Personal life
Forss hails from a football family. His father Tero Forss and brother Niclas are both involved in football, and his grandfather is former Finland international Rainer Forss. Growing up he was a Manchester United supporter.

Career statistics

Club

International

 Scores and results list Finland's goal tally first, score column indicates score after each Forss goal.

Honours
Brentford
EFL Championship play-offs: 2021

Individual
Brentford B Player of the Year: 2017–18
AFC Wimbledon Young Player of the Year: 2019–20
EFL Young Player of the Month: October 2019
EFL Cup Top Goalscorer: 2021–22
EFL Cup Team of the Tournament: 2021–22

References

External links

 Marcus Forss at mfc.co.uk
 Marcus Forss – SPL competition record
  
 
 
 

1999 births
Living people
Footballers from Turku
Finnish footballers
Finland youth international footballers
Finland under-21 international footballers
Finland international footballers
Association football forwards
Brentford F.C. players
AFC Wimbledon players
English Football League players
UEFA Euro 2020 players
Finnish expatriate footballers
Expatriate footballers in England
Finnish expatriate sportspeople in England
Premier League players
Hull City A.F.C. players
Middlesbrough F.C. players